Barhamsville (formerly Doncastle) is an unincorporated community in New Kent County, Virginia, United States. It is home to a monastery of the Poor Clares.

References

Unincorporated communities in Virginia
Unincorporated communities in New Kent County, Virginia